This is a list of dragons in popular culture. Dragons in some form are nearly universal across cultures and as such have become a staple of modern popular culture, especially in the fantasy genre.

Dragons in fiction
This list of dragons in fiction is a collection of various notable draconic characters that appear in various works of fiction. It is limited to well-referenced examples of dragons in literature, comics, film, television, animation and video games.

Dragons in literature 
Western literature tends either to affirm or pointedly subvert the traditional portrait of dragons from Western myth and folklore, as evil and greedy.

Author name legend

Dragons in comics
Dragons appear in various manga and american comics, in the form of comic books, comic strips and webcomics.

Dragons in film
Dragons have been portrayed in film and television in many different forms. They may terrorize human towns, or save human lives, even taking the role of passionate protectors.

Dragons in television

Dragons in animation

{| class="wikitable sortable" style="text-align: left"
|-
!Name
!Film
! class="unsortable" | Notes
|-
| Arctic
|Dinofroz: Dragon's Revenge
| He is Treek/Drakemon's generals. He is a white-bearded Asian dragon whose design resembles a bit of a ninja. Arctic uses his wings as blades. Arctic is a calm and intelligent but aggressive strategist. He has a kindred friendship with Petraeus since both were recruited as generals at the same time. He along with Petraeus keeps questioning Lord Drakemon about his plans and secrets that Drakemon keep hiding from them. General Arctic was accused of being a spy and a traitor to Drakemon and was put in the gladiator area to fight against the Fighter Dragons, Arctic was soon put in prison. From his accusation, he was replaced with Natterjack to take his place as general.
|-
| Balthromaw
|Rick And Morty
| A dragon who gets Soul-bonded to Morty before inadvertently soul-bonding with Rick. voiced by Liam Cunningham.
|-
| Brimscythe
|Legend of Vox Machina
| Brimscythe, the Iron Storm was a blue dragon. His human form was General Krieg, an identity he stole after killing the real Krieg to gain the manor in the Cloudtop District of Emon and the position of the Master of Law on the Tal'Dorei Council. Brimscythe was killed by Vox Machina in his lair.
|-
|Devon & Cornwall
|Quest for Camelot
|A conjoined two-headed dragon - the sophisticated and intelligent Devon and the boorish but loyal Cornwall. Thanks to the bullying from the rest of the dragons due to their differences and their inability to fly, they want nothing more than to be apart from one another
|-
|Discord
|My Little Pony: Friendship is Magic
|Recurring character first appearing as the main antagonist of the two-part Season 2 premiere "The Return of Harmony". Described as the spirit of chaos and disharmony. He is an eccentric ancient draconequus, a serpentine, chimeral creature with "the head of a pony and a body made up of all sorts of things".
|-
|Dragon
|Shrek
|A nameless red fire-breathing female dragon with ruby-colored scales, leathery bat-like wings, long, crested ears, and a prehensile tail. Does not speak; uses body language and noises to communicate. She has a taste for knights, her favorite dish; has a recipe book for preparing them for dinner.
|-
|Drakemon
|Dinofroz: Dragon's Revenge
|Originally he was known as Treek, was a former general of Neceron's army and one of Neceron's generals alongside Gladius, Kobrax, and Vlad, he was Vlad's best friend (supposedly). After Neceron's death, he Bathed in The Fires of Galgoth, sacred lava, which makes him and the dragons more powerful. After bathing in the sacred lava, he becomes the new lord of the dragons, under the name, Lord Drakemon. Drakemon is more humanoid than Reptile Like. He has a mane made out of the fire on his head to his back neck; along with Vlad, Arctic, and Petrus.
|-
|Elliott
|Pete's Dragon
|A green friendly dragon. Voiced by Charlie Callas.
|-
|Fang
|Avatar: The Last Airbender
|Avatar Roku's Spirit Guardian.
|-
|Goliath
|Dragon and Slippers
|Friendly dragon. Voiced by Dom DeLuise.
|-
| Gladius, the Gladiator Dragon
|Dinofroz
|Gladius is one of Neceron's generals. He appears to be the youngest and is not very wise. He blindly obeys his lord, and even after Neceron stole his powers, he refused to accept that his lord was wrong. Gladius is very strong but he has difficulties fighting the Dinofroz. He is very jealous of Vlad and along with Kobrax tried to kill Vlad. Gladius would have killed Vlad but two Vendetta Dragons appeared and he did not get the chance. Gladius mainly has fire-based powers. At the end of the series, he is seen to be buried under rocks after the Rockfroz explosion.
|-
|Haku
|Spirited Away
|A white dragon who befriends the protagonist, Sen/Chihiro, and eventually aids in her escape from Yubaba's bath house, although he is Yubaba's apprentice. He is able to turn into a human at will, as well as cast spells of unbinding, invisibility, and binding. Haku is the spirit of the Kohaku river, which a young Chihiro fell into as a child. Since then, the river has been paved over to make room for a mall. In smaller pieces of anime by the author concerning Spirited Away, it has been assumed that Chihiro's mother and father despised the river, for almost killing their daughter.
|-
|Kobrax, the Serpent Dragon
|Dinofroz
|Kobrax is one of Neceron's generals. He seems to be older than Gladius, but a lot younger than Vlad. He is very intelligent, but he uses his cleverness for evil purposes. He is very sly and he is very jealous of Vlad. He never acts thoughtlessly, and he is always word-fighting with Vlad. Kobrax can spit a paralyzing venom, a deadly venom, and fire. He can also tangle the foes with vines and squeeze them. He is a very dangerous dragon but obeys Neceron quite blindly. He wants to be the greatest of the generals, which made him try to kill Vlad. At the end of the series, he is seen to be buried under rocks after the Rockfroz explosion.
|-
|Light Fury
|How to Train Your Dragon
|A white, sparkly dragon with blue eyes. She's first seen locked up in a cage. Later, Toothless sees her and throughout the movie, they fall in love, have kids in the end of the movie and joins Hiccup & Astrid's family in the Homecoming holiday special.
|-
|Maleficent
|Sleeping Beauty
|Giant evil purple and black dragon. Breathes green fire. Transformed from human female. Ranked #1 in Ultimate Disney's 'Top 30 Disney Villains'. Also features in Kingdom Hearts video-game series.
|-
|Mushu
|Mulan
|Fa Mulan's closest companion throughout the Mulan series and comic relief. He is a Chinese dragon with ears - his body is a red color and he has orange accents. He seems to be small, but hints that he is bigger in his "real size" He is voiced by Eddie Murphy in his first appearance and Mark Moseley afterward.
|-
|Nazboo
|Shimmer and Shine
|Zeta's pet blue dragon who talks in a strange way and voiced by Dee Bradley Baker.
|-
|Natterjack
|Dinofroz: Dragon's Revenge
|A dragon frog who can spit poisonous slim. He was the first dragon to win a fight against Tom and the Dinofroz in a rematch (due to being part of the plan to fake a retreat). When General Arctic was blamed for being a traitor, Drakemon made Natterjack a general, taking Arctic's place. He returned in Episode 19 and then continue appearing more as a general.
|-
|Neceron
|Dinofroz|Neceron is the dragon lord king patriarch and master of the Dragon Land. Absolute Lord King Patriarch and Master of the Dragons and terror of the Dinofroz world, Neceron is the evil tyrant who wants to rid the Earth of all humans and dinosaurs. He is the only one who knows the true meaning of Prophecy. Neceron is the Dinofroz’s main enemy and, without any doubt, the most dangerous and powerful of all Dragons. With a simple glance, he can pierce rock and his flame can melt mountains.
|-
|Predaking
|Transformers: Prime - Beast Hunters|An intelligent and powerful robotic dragon. Created by the Decepticons and brought to life by Shockwave.
|-
|Spike
|My Little Pony|A baby dragon who first met the ponies in Firefly's Adventure and came to live them. In the Friendship is Magic series, he is the assistant of Twilight Sparkle, who raised him from an egg, and has the task of delivering her messages to Princess Celestia.
|-
|Stormfly
|How to Train Your Dragon|A large, bipedal, light blue dragon with very large wings and an array of horns sprouting from its crown. Stormfly is Astrid's dragon, and her species is known as the "Deadly Nadder." She, along with the rest of her kind, has the ability to release poisonous spines from her tail. Combined with the momentum of tail-whipping motions, Nadders like stormfly make excellent marksmen (or marksdragons, rather), despite their frontal blind spot.
|-
|Summer
|DreamWorks Dragons: Rescue Riders|A fastfin dragon who shoots water from her mouth and swims in bodies of water. Voiced by Skai Jackson.
|-
|Tabaluga
|Tabaluga|Tabaluga lives in the fictional place of Greenland. He is around 7 dragon-years old (700 human years). His father died when he was six. Nothing is known about his mother. After his father's death Tabaluga is the last of the dragons and the crown-prince of Greenland, defending his home from two rival kingdoms on either side of Greenland; a frigid arctic tundra, ruled by the evil snowman Arktos and a searing desert, ruled by an evil sand-spirit Humsin.
|-
|Terezi's Lusus
|Homestuck|Unborn parent figure and psychic mentor to Terezi Pyrope.
|-
|Tiamat
|Dungeons & Dragons|Venger's arch-rival is a fearsome dragon with a screeching, multi-level voice and five heads. Although Venger and the children both avoid Tiamat, the children make a deal with her in "The Dragon's Graveyard" to thwart Venger.
|-
|Toothless
|How to Train Your Dragon|A black, sleek-headed dragon with retractable teeth and green eyes. Became a loyal companion to Hiccup after he helped Toothless regain his flight when giving him a prostheses tail. His species is known as the "Night Fury" for its appearance and swift combat tactics. Night Furies such as Toothless have the ability to strike quickly and retreat to retaliate, but they are also adept in direct combat as well.
|-
|Trogdor
|Trogdor|Trogdor the Burninator is an original character created by Strong Bad in the sbemail dragon.
|-
|Vlad, the Vampire Dragon
|Dinofroz|Vlad is one of Neceron's generals. He appears to be an aged, veteran warrior and more skilled than the other generals, Gladius and Kobrax. He is Neceron's most appreciated general, but this won't prevent Neceron from stealing his powers in the last episode. He was once attacked by Gladius and Kobrax, who were jealous of him. They seriously wounded him, but he managed to stay alive. Vlad was also good friends with Treek, another dragon. However, Treek betrayed him and their friendship ended. But still, Vlad freed Treek when Neceron had captured him. He can minimize himself, and by biting his foe's neck, he can transform the unlucky victim into a vampire dragon, not an ordinary vampire. It is possible that he did not die at the end of the series, as he was not seen buried under the rocks like the other Generals, after the Rockfroz explosion. Vlad is not completely evil. He appears to be very loyal and sensible too. He reappears in the second season as Treek/Drakemon's general. Soon Vlad realized that Drakemon is becoming insane and eventually helps the Dinofroz to save the world; proving that Vlad was the true future spy that Drakemon feared for the whole season. His new appearance is more different than his wyvern-like body, he resembles more of a two-tailed European dragon with bat ears.
|-
|Whimsey Weatherbe
|My Little Pony: Twinkle Wish Adventure|
|-
|Winger
|DreamWorks Dragons: Rescue Riders|A Swiftwing dragon. Voiced by Zach Callison.
|}

Dragons in video games
Dragons appear in numerous games with fictional setting as bosses, final bosses, and enemies, as well as player characters, companions, units, and supporting characters.

 Other appearances in popular culture 

 Dragons in online audiovisual media 

 The Strong Bad Emails (flash cartoons) on the Homestar Runner website feature a dragon named Trogdor the Burninator.
The Great Dragon of Bleecker Street is a character featured in Dimension 20's The Unsleeping City. Dragons in radio 

 Trorg, the Last Amber Dragon, and the blue sock-stealing dragons in Hordes of the Things Dragons in songs 

 Albi, from the Flight of the Conchords song "Albi the Racist Dragon"
 "Puff, the Magic Dragon" is best known from the hit single by Peter, Paul and Mary, but has been performed by countless other artists. "Puff the Magic Dragon" was first a poem by Leonard Lipton and adapted by Peter Yarrow. The poem tells of an ageless dragon who befriends a young boy, only to be abandoned as the boy ages and forgets him. This is sometimes suspected of being riddled with references to marijuana, though the authors have publicly ridiculed this notion. The dragon in the song is most likely a reference to children's imagination and innocence.
 Tharos, from the Emerald Sword Saga, a collection of five albums by the symphonic metal band Rhapsody
 The titular dragon in the song "The Dragon and Saint George" (2015) from Ten's release of the same name

 Dragons in puppetry 

 Dirty Dragon from The BJ and Dirty Dragon Show and Gigglesnort Hotel
 Scorch the Teenaged Dragon, Ronn Lucas' ventriloquism puppet
 Delbert the Dragon, created by Jim Henson for La Choy commercials

 Dragons in toys 

 Scorch, Slayer, Loong, Dragon, Legend, Magic in Beanie Baby Megatron in Beast Wars becomes a bio-mechanical dragon after absorbing the essence of his ancestor.
 Predaking and the Predacons in Transformers: Prime have robotic dragons as alternate forms.
 Jinafire Long, the daughter of a Chinese dragon from Monster High''

Dragons in theme parks and shows 

 Tradinno, the world's largest walking robot
 Prezzemolo in Gardaland
 Figment in Journey into Imagination with Figment
 Danny in Happy Hollow Park & Zoo
 The Dragon in Legoland
The 6 Dragons in Phantasialand

Dragons in sport 

 FC Porto, football team
 Mario the Magnificent, Drexel Dragons mascot
 Stuff the Magic Dragon, Orlando Magic mascot
 San Francisco Dragons, field lacrosse team
 Somerset County Cricket Club, cricket team
 St. George Illawarra Dragons, Rugby league team
 Wales national football team, national association football team of Wales

Dragons in podcasts 
 Hiram McDaniels, a "literal five-headed dragon", and his sister Hadassah McDaniels from Welcome to Nightvale. Each head demonstrates differing personality traits and behaviors.
 Cerulean Depths Seen from a Great Height (A.K.A. Ceri). A gargantuan sea dragon with a long name and a snobby teen attitude, from Spout Lore.

See also
 List of dragons in mythology and folklore
 Chinese dragon, the Eastern interpretation of the dragon
 European dragon, the Western interpretation of the dragon
 Dragon Day, a celebration at Cornell University
 Princess and dragon, the archetypical/stereotypical premise about dragons kidnapping princesses

References

 
popular culture